Nookat (also: Naukat) is a district of Osh Region in south-western Kyrgyzstan. The administrative seat lies at Nookat.

Demographics
The population of Nookat District, according to the Population and Housing Census of 2009, was 236,455. 16,125 people live in urban areas, and 220,330 in rural ones.

Ethnic composition
According to the 2009 Census, the ethnic composition of the Nookat District (de jure population) was:

Towns, rural communities and villages

In total, Nookat District includes 1 town and 75 settlements in 16 rural communities. Each rural community can consist of one or several villages. The rural communities and settlements in the Nookat District are:

 town Nookat
 Bel (seat: Bel; incl. Borbash, Jash and Tash-Bulak)
 Gülstan (seat: Frunze; incl. Gülstan, Besh-Korgon, Boston and Chong-Kyshtoo)
 Isanov (seat: Jangy-Bazar; incl. Jar-Korgon, Fedorov, Chech-Döbö, Kojoke and Kichik-Alay)
 Jangy-Nookat (seat: Jangy-Nookat; incl. Kyzyl-Teyit, Temir-Koruk, Döng-Kyshtak, Jandama, Katta-Tal, Künggöy-Khasana, Monchok-Döbö and Teskey)
 Kara-Tash (seat: Kara-Tash; incl. Noygut)
 Kengesh (seat: Kuu-Maydan; incl. Ak-Terek, Arbyn, Chegeden, Shankol, Bayysh, Batuu and Dary-Bulak)
 Kök-Bel (seat: Kök-Bel; incl. Kayyndy)
 Kulatov (seat: Kojo-Aryk; incl. Ak-Chal, Baglan, Kosh-Döbö, Kyzyl-Bulak, Abshyr-Ata, Aryk-Teyit and Kulushtan)
 Kyrgyz-Ata (seat: Kötörmö; incl. Borko, Kara-Oy, Kara-Tash, Kyrgyz-Ata, Tash-Bulak and Ak-Bulak)
 Kyzyl-Oktyabr (seat: Kök-Jar; incl. Alashan, Borbash, Jiyde, Karanay and Sarykandy)
 Mirmakhmudov (seat: Chapaev; incl. Aral, Baryn, Budaylyk, Kapchygay and Kara-Koktu)
 Nayman (seat: Nayman; incl. Uluu-Too)
 On Eki-Bel (seat: On Eki-Bel; incl. Naray, Myrza-Nayman, On-Eki-Moynok and Örnök)
 Toktomat Zulpuev (seat: Üch-Bay; incl. Aybek, Ak-Chabuu, Internatsional, Karake, Kommunizm, Ösör, Tashtak, Chuchuk and Yatan)
 Töölös (seat: Murkut; incl. Ay-Tamga, Gerey-Shoron, Jayylma, Dodon, Kengesh, Merkit and Tolman)
 Yntymak (seat: Yntymak; incl. Besh-Burkan, Aryk-Boyu, Döng Maala, Akshar, Tash-Bulak, Chelekchi and Nichke-Suu)

References 

Districts of Osh Region